Planet Gemini is the second studio album by American heavy metal musician Michael Angelo Batio. Recorded at M.A.C.E. Court Studios in Chicago, Illinois, it was released in 1997 by his own label M.A.C.E. Music. Batio performed the majority of instruments on the release, as well as producing, engineering and mixing the album.

Background and production
Michael Angelo Batio's second solo album, Planet Gemini, was recorded and mixed at M.A.C.E. Court Studios in his hometown Chicago, with Batio handling all production, engineering and mixing; Pat Lilley mastered the album at Nexus Studios in Waukesha, Wisconsin. All electric and acoustic guitars, vocals, bass, keyboards, drums and percussion were performed by Batio, with keyboardist Frank Lucas and drummer Chuck White performing on "No Boundaries Part II".

Reception and legacy
Guitar Nine Records praised Planet Gemini for its "tight arrangements and very clean production", noting the speed and quality of Batio's guitar playing on the album. Their review highlighted the song "Time Traveler" in particular, and described the style of the album as "progressive [and] hard edged".

Planet Gemini was remastered and reissued in 2006, with previously unreleased instrumental versions of "So Much to Live For" and "These Four Walls" replacing the original tracks, plus the addition of "Enough Is Enough" from Lucid Intervals and Moments of Clarity. "Time Traveler" was also included on Batio's 2010 Metal Method instructional video Speed Kills 2010.

In 2007, Batio released the album 2 X Again, which features remixed and remastered songs from Planet Gemini and previous album No Boundaries with re-recorded drums by Joe Babiak. From Planet Gemini, the tracks "No Boundaries Part II: Intro", "Time Traveler" and "Planet Gemini" are included.

Track listing

Personnel
Personnel credits adapted from the album's booklet.

Michael Angelo – electric guitars, acoustic guitars, vocals, bass, keyboards, additional drums, percussion, arrangements, production, engineering, mixing
Frank Lucas – Kurzweil K2500X and Korg Trinity keyboards ("No Boundaries Part II")
Chuck White – drums and percussion ("No Boundaries Part II")
Pat Lilley – mastering
The Watericolor Group – design
Dan Machnik – photography

References

1997 albums
Michael Angelo Batio albums
M.A.C.E. Music albums